Diallo Abdoulaye Djibril is a Guinean footballer who currently plays for Melbourne Knights FC in the Victorian Premier League as a midfielder.

References
Diallo Abdoulaye Djibril at soccerway.com 
Diallo Abdoulaye Djibril at youtube.com

Guinean footballers
1983 births
Living people
Association football midfielders
Gombak United FC players
PSIS Semarang players
Melbourne Knights FC players
Hougang United FC players
Semen Padang F.C. players